Cascade Falls is a waterfall from the Quartzville Creek in Linn County, Oregon. The waterfall is known for being a point for river rafting through the Quartzville corridor and is the centerpiece attraction of the Dogwood Recreation Site.

See also 
 List of waterfalls in Oregon

References

Waterfalls of Oregon
Landforms of Linn County, Oregon